Chloroclystis kampalensis is a moth in the  family Geometridae. It is found in Uganda.

References

Moths described in 1937
Chloroclystis
Moths of Africa